Longitude is a 2000 TV drama produced by Granada Television and the A&E Network for Channel 4, first broadcast between 2 and 3 January 2000 in the UK on Channel 4 and the US on A&E.  It is a dramatisation of the 1995 book of the same title by Dava Sobel.  It was written and directed by Charles Sturridge and stars Michael Gambon as clockmaker John Harrison (1693–1776) and Jeremy Irons as horologist Rupert Gould (1890–1948).

Plot
Longitude presents the story of Harrison's efforts to develop the marine chronometer and thereby win the Longitude prize in the 18th century. This is interwoven with the story of Gould, a retired naval officer, who is restoring Harrison's four chronometers and popularises his achievements in the early twentieth century.

Cast

Awards 
In 2001, Longitude was nominated for the British Academy Television Awards in ten categories, winning in five, including Best Actor (Michael Gambon) and Best Drama Serial.

References

External links

2000 — The Year in Review (Channel 4)

2000 British television series debuts
2000 British television series endings
2000s British drama television series
Channel 4 television dramas
2000s British television miniseries
History of navigation
Television series by ITV Studios
Television shows produced by Granada Television
English-language television shows